Thomas Tallevi (born 20 December 1982) is an Italian Grand Prix motorcycle racer.

Career statistics

Grand Prix motorcycle racing

By season

Races by year

References

1982 births
Living people
Italian motorcycle racers
250cc World Championship riders